Wolfgang Scheffler may refer to:

 Wolfgang Scheffler (historian) (1929–2008), Professor of Political Science and History, Free University of Berlin 
 Wolfgang Scheffler (inventor), inventor/promoter of Scheffler Reflectors for solar cooking
 Wolfgang Scheffler (musician), German pianist from Dresden Lift (band) formed in 1973